The 1979 National Soccer League season was the fifty-sixth season under the National Soccer League (NSL) name. The season began in May 1979 and concluded in September 1979 with Toronto First Portuguese producing a perfect season, which granted them the NSL Championship. First Portuguese would also secure the double by defeating Toronto Panhellenic for the NSL Cup. Toronto's undefeated streak lasted until the 1980 season and amounted to 52 games with Toronto Panhellenic breaking the streak. 

The NSL was operating a franchise in Northern Ontario, Quebec, and expanded its boundaries into the United States with two franchises in Detroit, Michigan.

Overview 
The membership in the league experienced a sharp decline as a mass exodus of clubs departed from the league, which caused the NSL to dissolve its Second Division. The primary reason for the mass departures revolved around a league bylaw that required all clubs to successfully pay all membership dues on the required deadline to avoid suspensions. Members such as Mississauga Hungaria, Ottawa Tigers, St. Catharines Heidelberg, Toronto Polonia, and Windsor Stars disbanded their teams, while Montreal Castors had intentions of acquiring a franchise in the North American Soccer League. Toronto Italia and Buffalo Blazers were inactive for the season but returned for the 1980 campaign. Though the league experienced a decline in membership it still expanded further into the United States with the acceptance of Detroit Besa and Detroit Vardar.    

The NSL also retained its presence in Quebec with the return of the Montreal Stars and an additional team in the Greater Toronto Area known as Toronto Canadians. Throughout the regular season, the standings had to be revised as Detroit Vardar withdrew from the competition. There were also reports circulating about preliminary plans for a potential national soccer league throughout the country.

Teams

Final standings

Cup  
The cup tournament was a separate contest from the rest of the season, in which all fifteen teams took part. The tournament would conclude in a final match for the Cup.

Finals

References

External links
RSSSF CNSL page
thecnsl.com - 1979 season

1979–80 domestic association football leagues
National Soccer League
1979